Marina FM or Marina Radio or Marina Station is the first private radio station in Kuwait at a frequency of 90.4 FM, located at Marina Mall. Marina FM delivered a new concept for presenting radio programs in a distinctive way unlike the common form that is used in Arabic radio shows.

Etymology
The name Marina basically comes from Marina Mall where the radio station is located, Marina Mall is considered one of the entertainment shopping centers in the State of Kuwait. In spite of the fact that Marina is not an originally Arabic word, it became a slang and it's locally used on a daily basis.

Studio design 
The studio is considered to be the first of its own in the Middle East, The studio is located on the second floor of the mall, with a view to the ground floor where it's easy to see the mall visitors which creates a unique atmosphere compared to the closed studios. It was designed in a modern style equipped with the newest radio techniques in addition to video cameras distributed around the studio to deliver it all on MarinaTV.

Launch
Marina FM was launched on 1 April 2005 on the frequency 88.8 FM and it's considered the first private station in Kuwait and it's owned by United Networks. From November 17, 2016, MarinaFM upgraded to a new frequency which is 90.4 since Q8 Pulse took the 88.8 frequency,

Concept 
Marina FM provided a distinguished line in the genres of shows and the way they're presented which differs from the usual mainstream in radio, Marina FM got closer to the audience through the local dialect and made itself reachable to people to offer new topics, songs, and media personalities.

MarinaFM Shows 
 Nagham AlSabah (Morning show airs from Sunday to Thursday at 6:30am)
 Noon (Noon show airs from Sunday to Thursday from 12-1pm)
 Al Diwaniyah (Noon show airs from Sunday to Thursday from 1-3pm)
 Refresh (Night show airs from Sunday to Thursday from 6-8pm)
 Top 20 (Hits charts race airs every Friday at 8:00pm)

References 
Annahar Newspaper | 
Al Rai Newspaper | 
Al Watan Newspaper |

External links
Marina FM website

2005 establishments in Kuwait
Radio stations established in 2005
Arabic-language radio stations
Radio stations in Kuwait
Mass media in Kuwait
Mass media in Kuwait City